Minnesota State Highway 48 (MN 48) is a  highway in east-central Minnesota, which runs from its interchange with Interstate Highway 35 in Hinckley and continues east to its eastern terminus at the Wisconsin state line (near Danbury), where it becomes Wisconsin Highway 77.

Highway 48 passes through the communities of Hinckley, Barry Township, Arlone Township, Cloverdale, and Clover Township.

Route description
State Highway 48 serves as an east–west route between Hinckley, Cloverdale, and Danbury, WI.

Highway 48 crosses the Grindstone River on the eastern edge of Hinckley.  The route crosses the Kettle River in Barry Township near Hinckley.  The eastern terminus of Highway 48 is at the St. Croix River, where the route becomes Wisconsin Highway 77 upon crossing the river.

St. Croix State Park is located 15 miles east of Hinckley on Highway 48, then 5 miles south on County Road 22.
The St. Croix State Forest is located east of Cloverdale near the route.

Highway 48 is also known as Fire Monument Road in the city of Hinckley.

The route provides major access to Grand Casino Hinckley.

The route is legally defined as Legislative Route 195 in the Minnesota Statutes. It is not marked with this number.

Most of the highway is posted at 60 mph.  Lower speed limits are in place from Interstate 35 to just east 
of Grand Casino near Hinckley Road, and through Cloverdale, where a short 45 mph segment exists.  The 
maximum speed limit was raised from 55 mph to 60 after a study was completed in 2016.

History
State Highway 48 was authorized in 1933.

The route was paved by 1953.

Major intersections

References

048
Transportation in Pine County, Minnesota